The 2013–14 LNB Pro A season was the 92nd season of the French Basketball Championship and the 27th season since inception of the Ligue Nationale de Basketball (LNB).

The regular season started on October 4, 2013 and ended on May 5, 2014. The Playoffs started on May 12. Limoges CSP won their 10th French title and their first since 2000. Strasbourg IG was runner-up.

Teams

Regular season

Playoffs

Statistics leaders

Awards

French MVP
 Antoine Diot (Strasbourg IG)
Foreign MVP
 Randal Falker (SLUC Nancy)
Top scorer
 Edwin Jackson (ASVEL Basket)

Best Young Player
 Clint Capela (Élan Chalon)
Best Defender
 Tony Dobbins (JDA Dijon)
Most Improved Player
 Clint Capela (Élan Chalon)

Finals MVP
 Alex Acker (CSP Limoges)
Best Coach
 Jean-Louis Borg (JDA Dijon)

References

External links 
  LNB website

LNB Pro A seasons
French
LNB Pro A